Todd Murray (born in Lewisburg, Pennsylvania) is an American cabaret singer and songwriter.

Murray grew up in the small rural town of Montandon, Pennsylvania and graduated from Susquehanna University with a Bachelor of Arts degree in music and business, and from there went on to be involved in theater productions at the Paper Mill Playhouse and the South Coast Repertory. He starred in an Off-Broadway production of The Gondoliers by Gilbert and Sullivan and joined the touring production of the Broadway musical The Secret Garden. From the stage, Murray moved to work in nightclub and cabaret settings and built a solid reputation as a crooner, singing jazz, swing, and American standards nationally and internationally with critical acclaim.

Murray can be heard singing "Why Not Me?" in the Sundance 2003 Special Jury Award-winning feature film Die, Mommy, Die and in HBO's Showgirls: Glitz and Angst. He has been a featured performer at Lincoln Center's Rose Hall, New York's Town Hall, and the Broadway By the Year series. Murray has toured internationally, headlining on Royal Viking Cruises and performed as a lead singer at Disney in Tokyo. His first cabaret show, "Let's Face the Music", premiered at Hollywood's Cinegril and was named LA Weekly 's Cabaret Pick of the Week.

In 2002, Murray released his first CD, When I Sing Low and was voted one of Talkin' Broadway's Top Ten vocal albums of 2002. The album features a song written by Murray, "When I Sing Low," and a duet of "Just in Time" with jazz singer Sue Raney. In 2008, he released his second CD, Stardust and Swing, based on his touring show of the same name. The album was nominated for the MAC Award for Best Recording of 2008.

References

External links
 Official site

Living people
1964 births
American singer-songwriters
American cabaret performers
Susquehanna University alumni